Jeffrey Henderson Smith is a former professor of mathematics at Purdue University in Lafayette, Indiana. He received his Ph.D. from the Massachusetts Institute of Technology in 1981, under the supervision of Daniel Kan, and was promoted to full professor at Purdue in 1999. His primary research interest is algebraic topology; his best-cited work consists of two papers in the Annals of Mathematics on "nilpotence and stable homotopy".

Publications

References

Year of birth missing (living people)
Living people
Topologists
Massachusetts Institute of Technology alumni
Purdue University faculty
20th-century American mathematicians
21st-century American mathematicians